The Space Communications and Navigation (SCaN) program places the three prime NASA space communications networks, Space Network (SN), Near Earth Network (NEN) (previously known as the Ground Network or GN), and the Deep Space Network (DSN), under one Management and Systems Engineering umbrella. It was established in 2006. It was previously known as the Space Communications & Data Systems (SCDS) Program.

History
Before NASA's administrator Michael D. Griffin created SCaN to direct an integrated networks program, different organizations at NASA Headquarters have managed the Agency's space communications capabilities and functions under separate Programs using a variety of administrative approaches.

The SCaN Office was established by direction of Griffin in a Memorandum entitled "Establishment of a Space Communications and Navigation Office," dated July 19, 2006. SCaN operates as a central organization within the Human Exploration and Operations Mission Directorate (HEOMD):

The Ground Network (GN) has since been renamed the Near Earth Network.

Services
SCaN is viewed as a service provider supporting interfaces and performing a standard set of functions, including:
 Forward data transfer (uplink to spacecraft)
 Return data transfer (downlink from spacecraft to ground)
 Dissimilar voice communications
 Emergency communications
 Post-landing communications
 Radiometric measurement
 Time correlation
 Service monitoring
 Ephemeris exchange
 Operational coordination
 Service scheduling.

Communications schemes
Communications with spaceborne platforms is performed by RF, with a selection of spectra, modulation, and encoding methods, enumerated below.

Spectra
The Space Network communicates with spacecraft using S-band, Ku-band, and Ka-band with planned laser/optical communications.

The Deep Space Network communicates with spacecraft using S-band, X-band, and Ka-band.

Modulation
SN uses phase-shift keying and phase modulation of the carrier signal.

Encoding
The Space Network (used for near-Earth communications) supports the following encoding schemes:
 BPSK
 QPSK/SQPSK
 8PSK
 Rate 1/2 convolutional coding
 SQPN
 PRN coding - used to reduce power spectral density for low bit rate signals, and for time transfer.

The Reed–Solomon method is used as the initial error-correcting block code prior to the selected secondary encoding scheme.

See also
 Indian Deep Space Network
 Tracking and Data Relay Satellite
 Eastern Range
 NASCOM

References

External links
 NASA.gov

Deep Space Network